Arsenal Česká Lípa is a Czech football club located in Česká Lípa. It currently plays in the fourth tier of Czech football.

In the 1996–97, 1997–98 and 1998–99 seasons, the club played in the Czech 2. Liga.

Since 2011, Česká Lípa has been a farm team for Czech 2. Liga side FK Baník Most.

Historical names
 1927 – ČsSK Česká Lípa
 1945 – Sokol Česká Lípa
 1946 – Sokol Železničáři Česká Lípa
 1948 – Sokol Tatra Česká Lípa
 1953 – DSO Spartak Česká Lípa
 1960 – TJ Spoza Česká Lípa
 1961 – TJ SZ Česká Lípa
 1977 – TJ Vagonka Česká Lípa
 ? – FK Česká Lípa
 2008 – Arsenal Česká Lípa

References

External links
 Official website 

Football clubs in the Czech Republic
Association football clubs established in 1927
Česká Lípa District
Sport in the Liberec Region
1927 establishments in Czechoslovakia